du Toit is an Afrikaans surname of French origin, originally from François du Toit, a Huguenot who moved to South Africa in 1686. It translates as "of the roof". People with the surname include:
Alexander du Toit (1878–1948), South African geologist
Anri du Toit aka Yolandi Visser, South African musician
Braam du Toit (born 1981), South African composer
Christiaan du Toit (1901–1982), South African military commander
Daniel du Toit (1871–1959), South African astronomer
Dirk du Toit (1943–2009), South African politician
Elize du Toit (born 1981), South African born, British actress
Flooi du Toit (1869–1909), South African cricketer
Francois Jacobus du Toit (1897-1961), South African journalist and economist
Gaffie du Toit (born 1976), South African rugby union footballer
Gerard'd du Toit, South African composer and conductor
Jané du Toit (born 1975), Namibian rugby union footballer
Lydia Lindeque (1916–1997), South African actor
Natalie du Toit (born 1984), South African swimmer
Nick du Toit, South African arms dealer
Paul du Toit (1965–2014), South African artist
Pieter-Steph du Toit (born 1992), South African rugby union player 
Rachel Alida du Toit (1916–1997), South African actor
Simoné du Toit (born 1988), South African shot putter
Stephanus Jacobus du Toit (1847–1911), South African Afrikaans language pioneer
Wikus du Toit, (born 1972), South African actor
Francois du Toit (born 1990) SAAF

Other uses 
Du Toit Mountains, Antarctica
Du Toits Peak, Western Cape, South Africa
Du Toit's torrent frog, Arthroleptides dutoiti, species in the family Petropedetidae
57P/du Toit–Neujmin–Delporte, comet

French-language surnames
Afrikaans-language surnames